When We Don't Exist is the debut studio album by American metalcore band Like Moths to Flames. The album was released on November 8, 2011, through Rise Records and was produced by Will Putney. It is the band's first and only release with drummer Lance Greenfield, who left the band in 2012. It is also the last release with another drummer Kevin Rutherford, who performed on two bonus tracks of the deluxe reissue of the album. The album is also the band's first release with lead guitarist Eli Ford. As of 2012, music videos were produced for the songs "You Won't Be Missed", and "The Worst in Me", as well as a live video for "GNF". A reissue of the album was released on November 20, 2012 featuring two new songs.

Critical reception

The album received mostly positive reviews, but also mixed reviews from several critics. Zach Redrup from Dead Press! rated the album positively calling it: "For someone who is somewhat sceptical about the majority of metalcore that makes its way out of America these days, I would say that this is fairly good. It definitely packs all the better elements of the genre into a neat bundle that even your grandmother can get on with. It's well executed, a bit plain, but generally far from boring. Even if metalcore isn't your game you should give this a go. Who knows? You might be like me and discover a new band that you actually quite like." KillYourStereo gave the album 30 out of 100 and said: "Like Moths To Flames have offered up a completely generic sounding record without a single attempt at originality, which these days, is just simply unacceptable." New Transcendence gave the album a score 4/5 and saying: "The bottom line about this album is: If you thought you liked the band or even KNEW you liked the band when you first heard them, you will LOVE them now. The high-energy, aggressive in your face band they were in the beginning is completely revamped and recharged on this album. It explodes with fury and yet is melodic enough to tempt a good bit of previously unlikely listeners. Definitely give this album a listen! Check out When We Don't Exist out now on Rise Records and prepare your ears for one hell of a treat!"

Track listing

Personnel
Credits adapted from AllMusic.
 Like Moths to Flames
 Chris Roetter – lead vocals
 Eli Ford – lead guitar
 Zach Huston – rhythm guitar
 Aaron Evans – bass, backing vocals
 Lance Greenfield – drums, percussion
 Kevin Rutheford – drums, percussion (on tracks 1 & 2 of the deluxe reissue)

 Additional musicians
 Danny Leal of Upon a Burning Body – guest vocals on track "GNF"

 Additional personnel
 Will Putney – production, engineering, mixing, mastering, composition
 Charlie Busacca – engineering
 Alberto de Icaza – editing
 Jay Sakong – editing
 Jason Malhoyt – management
 Mike Mowery – management
 JJ Cassiere – booking
 Craig Ericson – A&R
 Daniel Wagner – art direction, design, photography

References

2011 debut albums
Like Moths to Flames albums
Nuclear Blast albums
Rise Records albums
Albums produced by Will Putney